Harry Truman Chafin (born July 10, 1945) is a former Democratic member of the West Virginia Senate, representing the 6th district from 1982 to 2014. He served as Majority Leader from 1998 to 2010. He is married to Letitia Neese Chafin and has three daughters, Lizzie, Carah, and Carly. Lizzie is the daughter of Chafin's ex-wife and former law partner, Gretchen Lewis.

Electoral history

|+ West Virginia's 6th senatorial district: Results 1982–2014
! Year
!
! Democrat
! Votes
! %
!
! Republican
! Votes
! %
|-
|1982
||
| |H. Truman Chafin
| |18,673
| |100%
|
| |No candidate
| |
| |
|-
|1986
||
| |H. Truman Chafin
| |11,401
| |100%
|
| |No candidate
| |
| |
|-
|1990
||
| |H. Truman Chafin
| |9,652
| |69%
|
| |Richard Bass
| |4,351
| |31%
|-
|1994
||
| |H. Truman Chafin
| |10,295
| |100%
|
| |No candidate
| |
| |
|-
|1998
||
| |H. Truman Chafin
| |10,669
| |100%
|
| |No candidate
| |
| |
|-
|2002
||
| |H. Truman Chafin
| |12,713
| |100%
|
| |No candidate
| |
| |
|-
|2006
||
| |H. Truman Chafin
| |14,621
| |100%
|
| |No candidate
| |
| |
|-
|2010
||
| |H. Truman Chafin
| |15,200
| |100%
|
| |No candidate
| |
| |
|-
|2014
||
| |H. Truman Chafin
| |11,172
| |49%
|
| |Mark R. Maynard
| |11,561
| |51%

References

External links
West Virginia Legislature - Senator H. Truman Chafin official government website
Project Vote Smart - Senator H. Truman Chafin (WV) profile
Follow the Money - H. Truman Chafin
2008 2006 2004 2002 1998 campaign contributions

Democratic Party West Virginia state senators
1945 births
20th-century American lawyers
Living people
People from Williamson, West Virginia
Marshall University alumni
West Virginia lawyers
21st-century American politicians